The New Hampshire National Guard is the militia of the U.S. state of New Hampshire. As a state militia, units in the New Hampshire National Guard are under the jurisdiction of the Governor of New Hampshire through the office of the state adjutant general, unless they are federalized by order of the President of the United States. The New Hampshire National Guard consist of:

New Hampshire Army National Guard
New Hampshire Air National Guard
157th Air Refueling Wing

See also
 New Hampshire State Guard

External links

Bibliography of New Hampshire Army National Guard History compiled by the United States Army Center of Military History via Wayback Machine

National Guard (United States)
Military in New Hampshire
New Hampshire militia
National Guard